Ramadhan Chombo (born 9 December 1987) is a Tanzanian football midfielder who plays for Biashara United.

References

1987 births
Living people
Tanzanian footballers
Tanzania international footballers
Simba S.C. players
Azam F.C. players
Mbeya City F.C. players
Friends Rangers F.C. players
African Lyon F.C. players
Association football midfielders
Tanzanian Premier League players